Nicoleta Coica (born 25 June 1982) is a Moldovan former swimmer, who specialized in sprint freestyle events. Coica qualified for the women's 100 m freestyle at the 2004 Summer Olympics, by clearing a FINA B-standard entry time of 58.31 from the Russian Open Championships in Moscow. She challenged seven other swimmers on the second heat, including three-time Olympian Agnese Ozoliņa of Latvia. She rounded out the field to last place by 0.15 of a second behind India's Shikha Tandon in 59.85. Coica failed to advance into the semifinals, as she placed forty-seventh overall in the preliminaries.

References

1982 births
Living people
Olympic swimmers of Moldova
Swimmers at the 2004 Summer Olympics
Moldovan female freestyle swimmers
Sportspeople from Chișinău
20th-century Moldovan women
21st-century Moldovan women